Surveillance Australia Pty Ltd (formerly Cobham Aviation Services Australia - Special Mission) is an Australian aviation company. It is primarily engaged in servicing the Australian Border Force Coastwatch contract, flying surveillance patrols within the Australian Exclusive Economic Zone (AEEZ).

History
Surveillance Australia was established in 1994 by National Jet Systems as a subsidiary to operate fixed-wing aerial surveillance aircraft and patrols on behalf of the Australian Customs Service Coastwatch operations.

In 1999, National Jet Systems and its subsidiaries including Surveillance Australia, were acquired by Cobham plc for £24.5 million. 

In 2006, Surveillance Australia was awarded the 1 billion Coastwatch contract that will see its aircraft operating through to 2020. This contract saw operations be restricted to only 10 de Havilland Canada Dash 8 aircraft, retiring the previously mixed fleet including the Reims F406 Caravan II. This contract was due to be succeeded by the 2018 announcement by the Australian Government for the Future Maritime Surveillance Capability (FMSC), followed by an RFI release in October 2018.

In 2009, Surveillance Australia was rebranded to Cobham Aviation Services Australia - Special Mission to align its branding with the broader Cobham group.

At the end of 2021, with the existing contract close to expiring, the Department of Home Affairs approved a contract variation to extend it by 6 years to the 31st of December 2027. 

In October 2022, Surveillance Australia was acquired by the American government services contractor Leidos, and will be operated locally by Leidos Australia.

Operations

Surveillance Australia aircraft conduct over 14,000 hours a year of aerial surveillance in the AEEZ, searching for illegal fishing vessels, human traffickers, drug importation, immigration and quarantine breaches, and can assist in search and rescue operations.

Surveillance Australia has played major roles in several border protection operations, directly contributing to over 200 foreign fishing vessels being apprehended and destroyed for illegally fishing for shark fin, reef fish and dolphins in Australian waters each year.

It also formerly supported operations of a single airborne laser depth sounder (LADS) aircraft for the Royal Australian Navy, as a service via the aircraft owner, Fugro.

Fleet and bases

Headquartered in Adelaide, the company has three operational bases in Cairns, Darwin and Broome. It operates a fleet of six DHC-8-202 and four larger DHC-8-315 'Dash 8s' modified for maritime patrol and surveillance. One further Dash 8 was formerly configured for the LADS contract. This aircraft has now been de-configured, and is stored at Adelaide Airport.

The surveillance aircraft are equipped with Raytheon SeaVue surface search radars with additional Inverse synthetic aperture radar (ISAR), Synthetic aperture radar (SAR) and Moving target indication (MTI) capability, advanced electro-optical sensors and sophisticated communications suites. They can operate day and night close to land below lowest safe altitude. These aircraft can search an area of 110,000km² per flight.

The Mission Management System (MMS) developed by Adelaide-based Acacia Systems integrates various onboard surveillance systems and provides real time communications between aircrew and Maritime Border Command headquarters in Canberra. The same system is used on AMSA Search and Rescue aircraft, which are also operated by Leidos Australia.

Fleet 

Surveillance Australia fleet currently operates  10 aircraft:

 2 Bombardier DHC-8-202 Dash 8 (as of August 2019)
 4 de Havilland Canada DHC-8-202 Dash 8 (as of August 2019)
 3 Bombardier DHC-8-315 Dash 8 (as of August 2019)
 1 de Havilland Canada DHC-8-315 Dash 8 (as of August 2019)

See also 

 Australian Border Force
 Australian Coastwatch
 Border Protection Command
 LADS
 Leidos
 Maritime Border Command

References

External links 

Australian Customs Service
Cobham Special Mission
Surveillance Australia

Companies based in Adelaide
Aviation companies